"Gay Witch Hunt" is the third-season premiere of the American comedy television series The Office, and the show's twenty-ninth episode overall. Written by executive producer and show runner Greg Daniels and directed by Ken Kwapis, the episode first aired in the United States on September 21, 2006, on NBC.

The series depicts the everyday lives of office employees in the Scranton, Pennsylvania branch of the fictional Dunder Mifflin Paper Company. In the episode, Michael Scott (Steve Carell) discovers that Oscar Martinez (Oscar Nunez) is gay. Michael tries to show Oscar that he is accepting of his sexual orientation, but only ends up insulting him. It is also revealed that after kissing Pam Beesly (Jenna Fischer), Jim Halpert (John Krasinski) went through with transferring to Stamford. In addition, Pam called off her engagement with Roy Anderson (David Denman).

The episode features a kiss between Michael and Oscar. This scene was not scripted, and was an improvised moment courtesy of Carell. An estimated 9.1 million viewers watched the episode, a 23 percent increase from the previous season premiere "The Dundies". "Gay Witch Hunt" received positive reviews from television critics.

Plot 
After calling Oscar Martinez (Oscar Nunez) "faggy", Michael Scott (Steve Carell) learns that Oscar finds the word offensive because he is homosexual.  While attempting to apologize, Michael inadvertently outs Oscar to the entire office. Jan Levinson (Melora Hardin) berates Michael for his behavior, after Michael's seminar on homosexuality is a disaster. When Oscar threatens to quit, Michael attempts to reconcile with Oscar, first by hugging him, and then kissing him on the lips. Oscar is given three months paid vacation and use of a company car in exchange for not suing Dunder Mifflin.

It is revealed that after their kiss, Pam Beesly (Jenna Fischer) confirmed to Jim Halpert (John Krasinski) her intention to marry Roy Anderson (David Denman). However, a few days before the wedding, Pam got cold feet and decided to call it off. She moved into her own apartment and began taking art classes. Pam's rejection sent Roy into a downward spiral, hitting rock bottom with a drunk driving arrest. When being interviewed by the camera crew, Roy makes a vow to win Pam back.

Jim has transferred to Dunder Mifflin's Stamford branch and tries to settle into his new office. He then meets smug co-worker Andy Bernard (Ed Helms) who brags about his wild college days at Cornell University. Jim tries to target him like he targeted Dwight, but becomes scared of Andy's more violent tendencies. Meanwhile, sales representative Karen Filippelli (Rashida Jones) is disconcerted by Jim's constant smirks to the camera.

Production 
"Gay Witch Hunt" was the eighth episode of the series directed by Ken Kwapis. Kwapis had previously directed "Pilot", "Diversity Day", "Sexual Harassment", "The Fire", "The Fight", "Booze Cruise", and "Casino Night". "Gay Witch Hunt" was written by executive producer and show runner Greg Daniels.

The kiss between Michael and Oscar in the conference room was not scripted. The scene had been shot a couple of times with Steve Carell not kissing Oscar Nunez. Then on one take, Oscar saw "[Carell's] lips coming closer and closer". Nunez recalled "I'm like, 'Dear God, he's going to kiss me.' And sure enough, he planted one on my face." The other cast members were laughing during the kiss but because the camera stays focused on Carell and Nunez, the scene was still usable.

At Paleyfest in early 2007, Steve Carell later recalled that he enjoyed the episode "because it spoke to the fact that Michael is not a homophobe; he just doesn't understand the world. They are two very different things. It's not that he's intrinsically racist or homophobic or sexist, he just doesn't have a frame of reference. He's not capable of understanding. And once he does glean some understanding he misinterprets it into something altogether. But I think at least the way I feel about the character is he's a decent heart, a decent person and he's just trying his best."

The third season DVD contains a number of deleted scenes from this episode, including Karen pulling a prank on Jim by setting his dial tone to call Hong Kong, Andy comparing his jumping skills to Michael Jordan to Jim, Michael asking Pam how she is holding up since the wedding broke off, and Jan being furious at Michael.

Reception 
"Gay Witch Hunt" first aired on NBC on September 21, 2006. The Nielsen ratings for "Gay Witch Hunt" indicated that it was watched by approximately 9.1 million viewers, a 23 percent increase from the second season premiere "The Dundies".  During its timeslot, "Gay Witch Hunt" ranked second among men ages 18–49 and 24–54, and first among men ages 18–34.

"Gay Witch Hunt" generally received praise from critics. TV Guide'''s Matt Roush admitted that he "loved Oscar's self-deprecating reaction to his newfound notoriety". Roush said that when watching Michael "you can't help but forgive the idiot, while wondering how in the world he manages to keep his job," and that the kiss between Michael and Oscar was "horrifically funny". Brian Zoromski of IGN rated the episode with a 9 out of 10, an indication of an "amazing" episode. He observed that the episode's best scenes "show the impact of Jim and Pam being in different offices," and thought Andy's reactions made the audience appreciate Dwight more.

Steve West of Cinemablend stated that "the balance between laughing at Michael’s ineptitude and the discomfit of Oscar was handled so deftly that it’s a wonder the show became successful when similarly great writing in Arrested Development did nothing to garner viewers." For his work on this episode, Greg Daniels won the Primetime Emmy Award for Outstanding Writing for a Comedy Series. Ken Kwapis also received a Primetime Emmy Award nomination for Outstanding Directing for a Comedy Series for his work on this episode as well, but lost to Ugly Betty''s Richard Shepard for his work on the pilot episode.

References

External links 
 "Gay Witch Hunt" at NBC.com
 

2006 American television episodes
American LGBT-related television episodes
The Office (American season 3) episodes
Emmy Award-winning episodes